Peter O'Brien (born 1987) is an Irish hurler who plays for Cork Intermediate Championship club Kildorrery and is a former member of the Cork senior hurling team. He usually lines out as a centre-forward.

Career statistics

Club

Inter-county

Honours

Kildorrery
Munster Junior Club Hurling Championship: 2012
Cork Junior A Hurling Championship; 2012
North Cork Junior A Hurling Championship: 2012

Cork
All-Ireland Intermediate Hurling Championship: 2015
Munster Intermediate Hurling Championship: 2015
Munster Minor Hurling Championship: 2004, 2005

References

1987 births
Living people
Kildorrery hurlers
Avondhu hurlers
Cork inter-county hurlers